Malaysia participated at the 2014 Asian Para Games in Incheon, South Korea from 18 to 24 October 2014.

Medalists

See also
Malaysia at the 2014 Asian Games

References

 

Nations at the 2014 Asian Para Games
2014 in Malaysian sport
Malaysia at the Asian Para Games